Gerardo López (born September 6, 1947) is a Spanish sprint canoer who competed in the late 1960s. He was eliminated in the repechages of the K-4 1000 m event at the 1968 Summer Olympics in Mexico City.

References

1947 births
Canoeists at the 1968 Summer Olympics
Living people
Olympic canoeists of Spain
Spanish male canoeists
20th-century Spanish people